Ichev Nunatak (\'i-chev 'nu-na-tak\) is the rocky hill rising to 1604 m in the northwestern periphery of Nimitz Glacier in Ellsworth Mountains.  It is named after Milan Ichev, geologist and builder at St. Kliment Ohridski base in 2000-2001 and subsequent seasons.

Location

Maps
 Vinson Massif.  Scale 1:250 000 topographic map.  Reston, Virginia: US Geological Survey, 1988.
 Antarctic Digital Database (ADD). Scale 1:250000 topographic map of Antarctica. Scientific Committee on Antarctic Research (SCAR). Since 1993, regularly updated.

Notes

References
 Ichev Nunatak. SCAR Composite Gazetteer of Antarctica.
 Bulgarian Antarctic Gazetteer. Antarctic Place-names Commission. (details in Bulgarian, basic data in English)

External links
 Ichev Nunatak. Copernix satellite image

Ellsworth Mountains
Bulgaria and the Antarctic
Nunataks of Ellsworth Land